Karen Hawkins (born July 20, 1957) is an American former track and field sprinter.

Hawkins was a member of the winning  relay team at the 1979 Pan American Games. She won the 200 metres at the 1980 USA Outdoor Track and Field Championships, with a time of 22.80 seconds (wind-aided), and finished third in the 100 metres. She placed second in the 1980 Olympic Trials 200 metres.

Her personal best time in the 200 metres was 22.76 seconds, run in 1980.

References

 

1957 births
Living people
American female sprinters
African-American female track and field athletes
Athletes (track and field) at the 1979 Pan American Games
Pan American Games gold medalists for the United States
Pan American Games medalists in athletics (track and field)
Medalists at the 1979 Pan American Games
21st-century African-American people
20th-century African-American sportspeople
20th-century African-American women
21st-century African-American women